Route 147 is a  state highway located in Cape May County in New Jersey, United States. It is a short connector between U.S. Route 9 in Middle Township and North Wildwood at New York Avenue. West of U.S. Route 9, the road continues to Route 47 as County Route 618 (Indian Trail Road); this route along with Route 147 provides an alternate route to The Wildwoods from Route 47. East of New York Avenue, the route continues south through The Wildwoods as County Route 621 (New Jersey Avenue). The route passes through mostly marshland along its journey, intersecting the Garden State Parkway at a partial interchange and County Route 619 (Ocean Drive).

The portion of the route east of the intersection with the latter forms a part of Ocean Drive. When the 500-series county routes were established in New Jersey in the 1950s, what is now Route 147 became a part of County Route 585, a route running from Lower Township north to Absecon. On November 1, 1971, Route 147 was designated along County Route 585 between U.S. Route 9 and the North Wildwood border. The route was extended to its current location in North Wildwood by the 1990s.

Route description
Route 147 begins at an intersection with U.S. Route 9 in the Burleigh section of Middle Township, heading to the east along North Wildwood Boulevard, a two-lane undivided road. The road continues to the west of U.S. Route 9 as County Route 618 (Indian Trail Road) to Route 47. The road passes residences and businesses to the north and woodland to the south before coming to a partial cloverleaf interchange with the Garden State Parkway that has access to and from the northbound direction of the parkway.

Past the Garden State Parkway, Route 147 becomes a four-lane divided highway that briefly passes more homes and commercial establishments before entering a delta-type series of marshy rivers and inlets. It turns to the southeast and comes to an intersection with County Route 665 before crossing the Grassy Sound on a bridge. After the bridge, the route comes to an intersection with the southern terminus of County Route 619 (Ocean Drive).

At this point, the Ocean Drive moniker merges onto Route 147 and the road crosses over the Beach Creek into the Jersey Shore town of North Wildwood. Here, the route turns south and becomes Spruce Avenue, which heads between marshland to the west and homes to the east. At the intersection with West Angelsea Drive, Route 147 becomes a four-lane undivided road that continues past more developments, turning to the southeast. Route 147 heads through a mix of residential and commercial establishments before ending at the intersection with New York Avenue. From here, County Route 621 continues south along the roadway as New Jersey Avenue. Route 147, along with County Route 618, provide an alternate route to The Wildwoods from Route 47.

History

What is now Route 147 was an unimproved road back in 1927. When the 500-series county routes were established in the 1950s, this road became a part of County Route 585, a route that ran from Route 109 (then a part of U.S. Route 9) in Lower Township north to U.S. Route 30 and Route 157 in Absecon. The route was also designated as part of County Route 18, which continued west past U.S. Route 9 to Route 47. On November 1, 1971, Route 147 was designated to replace the portion of County Route 18/County Route 585 between U.S. Route 9 in Burleigh and the North Wildwood border. In 1994, the current fixed-span steel girder bridge over the Grassy Sound was built.  As a result of the bridge replacement, Route 147 was realigned off its former drawbridge, and the former alignment became Cape May County Route 665. The southern terminus of County Route 585 was eventually truncated its current location at Route 52 in Somers Point. By the 1990s, Route 147 was extended to its current terminus at New York Avenue in North Wildwood.

In 2020, NJTA proposed a $10 million project to reconstruct the partial interchange between Route 147 and the Garden State Parkway into a full interchange.

Major intersections

See also

References

External links

NJ State Highways: 91-147 - Route 147
New Jersey Roads: Route 147
New Jersey Highway Ends: Route 147
Speed Limits for State Roads: Route 147

147
Transportation in Cape May County, New Jersey